The 1992 women's Olympic volleyball tournament was the eighth edition of the event, organised by the world's governing body, the FIVB in conjunction with the International Olympic Committee. The competition in Barcelona, Spain was held from 29 July to 8 August 1992 in three venues in the city: the Palau d'Esports, the Pavelló de la Vall d'Hebron and the Palau Sant Jordi, where the semi-finals and finals were played.

Qualification

* Notes:
1. China was the 1990 World Championship runners-up (champions Soviet Union, were already qualified as 1988 Olympic champions).
2. Japan was the 1991 Asian Championship runners-up (champions China, were already qualified as 1990 World Championship runners-up).
3. The Netherlands was the 1991 European Championship runners-up (champions Soviet Union, were already qualified as 1988 Olympic champions).
4. The United States was fourth at the 1991 World Cup (champions Cuba, runners-up China and third place Soviet Union were already qualified through other tournaments).

With the dissolution of the Soviet Union in December 1991, most of its now independent Republics formed the Commonwealth of Independent States (CIS) and competed together as the Unified Team.

Format
The tournament was played in two different stages. A single round-robin format was played within each pool to determine the teams position in the pool. The  (second stage) was played in a single elimination format, with the preliminary round pool positions set as:
Pool winners advanced to the semifinals.
Pool second and third placed advanced to the quarterfinals.
Pool fourth placed advanced to the 7th place match.

Pools composition

Rosters

Venues
 Palau d'Esports, Barcelona, Spain
 Pavelló de la Vall d'Hebron, Barcelona, Spain
 Palau Sant Jordi, Barcelona, Spain

Preliminary round

Group A

|}

|}

Group B

|}

|}

Final round

7th to 8th place

7th place match

|}

Final

Quarterfinals

|}

5th place match

|}

Semifinals

|}

Bronze medal match

|}

Gold medal match

|}

Final standings

Medalists

See also
Men's Olympic Tournament

References

External links
Results
Final standings (1964–2000) at FIVB.org
Official results (pgs. 415, 431–438)

O
1992
1992
Women's volleyball in Spain
1992 in Spanish women's sport
Vol